The 3rd constituency of Maine-et-Loire (French: Troisième circonscription de Maine-et-Loire) is a French legislative constituency in the Maine-et-Loire département. Like the other 576 French constituencies, it elects one MP using a two round electoral system.

Description
The 3rd Constituency of Maine-et-Loire lies in the north east of the department, including the northern half of Saumur (the southern half is included in Maine-et-Loire's 4th constituency).

The seat has supported parties of the centre right for the entirety of the 5th Republic. It was the only seat in Maine-et-Loire not to elect a deputy from Emmanuel Macron's centrist coalition at the 2017 elections.

Assembly members

Election results

2022

2020

 
 
 
 
 
 
|-
| colspan="8" bgcolor="#E9E9E9"|
|-

2017

 
 
 
 
 
 
 
 
|-
| colspan="8" bgcolor="#E9E9E9"|
|-

2012

 
 
 
 
 
 
|-
| colspan="8" bgcolor="#E9E9E9"|
|-

References

3